Llandaff North Rugby Football Club are a Welsh rugby union club based in Llandaff North, Cardiff in South Wales. The club is a member of the Welsh Rugby Union and is a feeder club for the Cardiff Blues.

They presently play in the WRU Division Three South East, having moved from Division Four South East in the 2007/08 season after winning first place in the league.

Club honours
 WRU Division Four South East 2007/08 – Champions

References

External links
Llandaff North RFC Official Site
Wales Rugby Clubs - Llandaff North RFC

Welsh rugby union teams
Sport in Cardiff